Nathalie Dechy and Andy Ram were the defending champions, but lost in the first round to Dominika Cibulková and Gaël Monfils.

Victoria Azarenka and Bob Bryan won in the final 6–2, 7–6(7–4), against Katarina Srebotnik and Nenad Zimonjić.

Seeds

Draw

Finals

Top half

Bottom half

External links
 Draw
2008 French Open – Doubles draws and results at the International Tennis Federation

Mixed Doubles
French Open by year – Mixed doubles